This is a list of companies who produce or have produced digital printers. This list includes only those companies who have actually designed and manufactured printers, not those who have only offered rebadged products.

A

B

C

D

E

F

G

H

I

J

K

L

M

N

O

P

Q

R

S

T

U

V

X

xanté

W

Z

References